Vuate Karawalevu (born 5 March 2001) is a Fijian professional rugby league footballer who plays as a er for the North Sydney Bears in the NSW Cup and Fiji at international level.

Background
Karawalevu was born in Suva, Central Division, Fiji.

He was educated at the Marist Brothers High School.

Playing career

Club career
Karawalevu is contracted to the Sydney Roosters in the NRL.

Whilst under contract at the Roosters, he played for the Kaiviti Silktails in the Ron Massey Cup in 2021.

Karawalevu also played in 2021 for the Roosters Jersey Flegg Cup side.

Playing as a er he scored 7 tries in just 6 games for the North Sydney Bears in the 2022 NSW Cup.

International career
In October 2022 Karawalevu was named in the Fiji squad for the 2021 Rugby League World Cup.

In October 2022 he made his international début for the Fiji Bati side against Italy.

References

External links
North Sydney Bears profile
Rakaviti profile
Fiji profile

2001 births
Living people
Rugby league wingers
Fijian rugby league players
Fiji national rugby league team players